Seo Geon-chang (born August 22, 1989) is a South Korean professional baseball infielder who is currently playing for the Kiwoom Heroes of the KBO League. Seo is the first (and only) player in KBO history to have recorded 200 hits in a season.

Seo graduated from Gwangju Jeil High School.

He debuted in the KBO League with the LG Twins in 2008, but was released after only having one at-bat in the KBO. He then left professional baseball to fulfill his compulsory military service. After the completion of his service, Seo tried out with the Nexen Heroes, eventually making it back to the KBO in 2012, when he won the KBO League Rookie of the Year Award.

In 2014 Seo had a league-record 201 hits to go along with a league-leading batting average of .370. He also set single-season records for runs scored, 135, and triples, 17. He won the KBO League Most Valuable Player Award for the 2014 season. With his MVP award, Seo became the second KBO player (after Hyun-jin Ryu) to win both Rookie of the Year and Most Valuable Player.

Seo played for the South Korea national baseball team in the 2017 World Baseball Classic.

References

External links
Career statistics and player information from the KBO League

Seo Geon-chang at heroes-baseball.co.kr 

Kiwoom Heroes players
LG Twins players
KBO League infielders
South Korean baseball players
Sportspeople from Gwangju
1989 births
Living people
2017 World Baseball Classic players